Eric Easton (1927–1995) was an English record producer and the first manager of British rock group the Rolling Stones. Originally from Lancashire, he joined the music industry playing the organ in music halls and cinemas. By the 1960s he had moved into management and talent spotting, operating from an office suite in London's Regent Street. Easton met Andrew Loog Oldham in 1963; Oldham wanted to sign an unknown band, called the Rolling Stones, about whom he was enthusiastic. At the time, the band were still playing small clubs and blues bars. Easton saw them once—at the Crawdaddy Club in Richmond—and agreed with Oldham. Their partnership was one of contrasts: Oldham has been described as bringing youth and energy, while Easton brought industry experience, contacts and financing. Together, they signed the group to both a management and publishing deal, which, while giving better terms for the group than the Beatles received, was to the advantage of Easton and Oldham who received a larger cut. Easton was primarily responsible for booking gigs—he was keen for the group to get out of London and play nationally—but also acted as record producer on a number of occasions, including on their first single, a cover version of Chuck Berry's "Come On" in June 1963. Easton was responsible for many aspects of the band's development, ranging from managing their fan club to organising their tour of America in 1964.

As the Stones' fame and popularity increased, so did their expectations of Easton. However, after a number of problems on an American tour, in 1965 Oldham decided to oust Easton from the partnership and bring in New York promotor Allen Klein. Oldham persuaded members of the group to support him and Easton was sacked. The band, with the exception of Bill Wyman, acquiesced. Easton launched a number of lawsuits for breach of contract, and eventually settled out of court for a large sum. In 1980 he and his family emigrated to Naples, Florida, where he went into business; his son, Paul, also became a music manager and booking agent.

Musical context
During the post-war era, British audiences became accustomed to American popular music. Not only did the two countries share a common language but Britain had, through the stationing of US troops there, been exposed to American culture during the Second World War. Although not enjoying the same economic prosperity as America, Britain experienced similar social developments, including the emergence of distinct youth leisure activities and sub-cultures. This was most evident in the popularity of the Teddy Boys among working-class youths in London from around 1953. British musicians had already been influenced by American styles, particularly in trad jazz, boogie-woogie and the blues. From these influences emerged rock and roll in America, which made its way to Britain through Hollywood films such as Blackboard Jungle and Rock Around the Clock (both 1955). A moral panic was declared in the popular press as young cinema-goers ripped up seats to dance; this helped identify rock and roll with delinquency, and led to it being almost banned by radio stations.

During this period, UK radio was almost exclusively controlled by the BBC, and popular music was only played on the Light Programme. Nevertheless, American rock and roll acts became a major force in the UK chart. Elvis Presley reached number 2 in the UK chart with "Heartbreak Hotel" in 1956 and had nine more singles in the Top 30 that year. His first number 1 was "All Shook Up" in 1957, and there would be more chart-toppers for him and for Buddy Holly and the Crickets and Jerry Lee Lewis in the next two years. The music journalist Stephen Davis notes that, by the end of the decade, "the Teds and their girls filled the old dance band ballrooms" of the kind Easton had played, and Keith Richards called it "a totally new era... It was like A.D. and B.C., and 1956 was year one". Record production was dominated by five main companies and London-orientated until the early 1960s. Similarly, promoters—who often combined the roles of manager and agents for their clients—almost always worked out of London too, and used their contacts in the regional music centres to make bookings.

Early life, career and meeting Oldham
Easton's early life has left very little mark on the record. It is known that he was born in 1927 in Rishton, Lancashire. At some point he entered the music business and is known to have played the organ in cinemas, on piers, and other tourist venues such as the Blackpool Tower. Easton's early work consisted of performing popular pieces such as Ray Martin's "Marching Strings", Richard Rodgers' "Slaughter on Tenth Avenue" and John Walter Bratton's "Teddy Bears' Picnic (which the BBC recorded in Southend for their Light Programme in 1953). He also played with his own ensemble, called Eric Easton and his Organites, and alongside contemporaries on the variety circuit such as Morecambe and Wise, Patrick O'Hagan and Al Read. Easton's career playing around Britain brought him experience of the music business both in and beyond London.

By the time he met Oldham and the Stones he had many years in showbusiness, and, says the music journalist Steven Davis, "an old-line talent agent... and veteran of variety shows". Musically, the mild-mannered Easton was "a self-confessed 'square'", who kept family photographs on his desk; comments, says the musician and author Alan Clayson, for whom "the depths of depravity" were a 20-a-day smoking habit. Mick Jagger and Brian Jones, who often used a private argot between themselves, would refer to Easton as an "Ernie". Balding and middle-aged by the early 1960s, his company, Eric Easton Ltd, had offices in Radnor House, Regent Street. In a later interview, Easton explained how he and Andrew Loog Oldham had met:

Easton later described his business partner Oldham as having "something of the Hayley Mills" about him, complained about his telephone usage and demanded he itemise his calls. Oldham—always dapper compared to the strictly suit-and-tie wearing Easton—described their partnership as Machiavellian and as a combination of energy and experience. Wyman agrees that Easton treated them in a business-like fashion when they first met, and Keith Richards later recalled how "if you opened any Melody Maker or NME at the time, you'd see an ad for Eric Easton Management Agency etc.". He described how, as he saw it, Easton

Career with The Rolling Stones

The Crawdaddy Club
In 1963, The Rolling Stones comprised bandleader Jones (guitar, harmonica, keyboards), Jagger (lead vocals, harmonica), Richards (guitar, vocals), Wyman (bass guitar), Charlie Watts (drums), and Ian Stewart (piano). Oldham had seen them play the Crawdaddy Club, Richmond that April and was impressed, thinking they would fill a gap in the British music scene. The Stones were the Crawdaddy's house band, under the aegis of the club's owner Giorgio Gomelsky, who had already "got them eulogized by Record Mirror... [and] was their manager in every way other than writing". At 19 years old, Oldham was too young to hold a band manager's licence, and as such he "trawl[ed] the lower reaches of West End theatrical agents" looking for a partner. Eventually, Oldham turned to Easton because he saw the older man as possessing both the financial experience and the contacts in the industry necessary to forward the band's career; Easton also possessed the professional gravitas to give Oldham's involvement credibility. The two discussed the matter. Oldham argued that managing the Stones was "the chance of a lifetime", and begged him to come to the Crawdaddy with him the next week to see for himself. Easton disliked missing Saturday Night at the London Palladium on television, which Oldham called being like going to mass for Easton. Talking to Q Magazine later, he described himself as "an average character of my age, wearing a sports jacket" who hoped his night would not be wasted.

Easton travelled to Richmond with Oldham and, in Crawdaddy's, says Clayson, "stood out like a sore thumb" in the young crowd. Gomelsky was absent, having recently left for Switzerland in order to attend his father's funeral. The future photographer James Phelge, who was also in the audience, later observed that Easton looked like a schoolteacher. For his part, Easton later complained to Peter Jones of his "total humiliation and embarrassment": surrounded by screaming teenagers, in "his heavy tweed suit and his heavy brogue shoes", Easton reckoned he looked a country squire. Of the crowd and the heat, too, he called Crawdaddy's "the first free Turkish bath I'd ever had". Although he "had winced more than once during the performance [he] was experienced in spotting talent", says his biographer Laura Jackson, and recognised it in the Stones. The Stones were willing listeners, and, over a drink after the show it was agreed that Jones would visit the Regent Street office the following week.

Gomelsky knew nothing of events until his return towards the end of the month. A later assistant of Richards, Tony Sanchez, described how, "to Brian and Mick, who wanted–needed–so very badly to make it, walking over a couple of old friends was a small price to pay for the break that Oldham and Easton were offering them". Gomelsky says that he met with Easton a few days after the Stones had signed to he and Oldham. They wanted, Gomelsky says, to offer him compensation for his previous input to the band's development. What actually concerned them, he argues, was that Gomelsky would allow the group to continue their residency at the Crawdaddy Club. Gomeslky agreed; Easton also began booking them into the Marquee Club and Studio 51, in London's West End, at around the same time.

Signing and Decca contract
Easton and Oldham were keen to sign the Stones up to a label as soon as possible. Dick Rowe, of Decca Records, had heard of the Stones through George Harrison, but when Rowe tried to contact their agent, no-one appeared to know of one. Eventually, Easton's name was mentioned: "I knew Eric, of course. Once I'd spoken to him, the whole deal went through in a matter of days." Easton and Oldham formed an independent record label, Impact Sounds—through which they would manage the group—and signed them on 6 May 1963 for a three-year deal. Philip Norman describes the meeting: Dick Rowe was a friend of Easton's. Rowe—having missed the chance of signing the Beatles the previous year and was still annoyed over it—agreed to sign the band. For their part, Easton and Oldham retained the rights to the group's recorded material, while the group themselves were effectively leased to Decca. Easton intended that he and Oldham would cut out the traditional role of the A&R man, to which end they formed Impact Sounds. This would own and hold all master tapes and recordings, which they would also lease—"Spector-like"—when required for distribution. However, the deal almost did not happen: unbeknownst to Easton and Oldham, Jones had already signed a personal recording contract with IBC. Easton gave Jones £100 with which to buy his way out of his obligations, and in doing so bought the group's master tapes for themselves. The eventual deal with Decca was better news for Easton and Oldham than it was for the band. For example, Easton and Oldman were to be paid 14% of any profits from a single release, but their commitment to the band was for 6%, meaning that Easton and his partner received over half of what was earned.

Easton later told Q that "because there was a lot of interest from other companies, I could go after a really good royalty rate on record sales. And we got it." Sandford comments—reflecting on the group's youth—that "everyone except Easton and Wyman had to have their parents co-sign" their contracts. Easton and Oldham received 25% of the group's earnings in fees. Easton, responsible for the group's wages, personally paid each member £40 a week. Wyman says that the band, too, recognised the different qualities Easton and Oldham brought to managing them, calling the two polar opposites. The group collectively saw them as a good combination, believing that Easton, while he understood little of their music was the kind of established agent they needed. Jagger, in a 1975 The Rolling Stone Interview called Easton "a 50-year-old northern mill owner. It was completely crackers."

Gigs and production work

Easton gained the Stones their early work, among the first of which was a Kellogg's Rice Krispies advert jingle. 
Easton saw the Stones as a continuation of the homely musicianship shown by the Beatles, Brian Poole and the Tremeloes. Comparing them to the Beatles, he identified a similarity in their beat and upfront guitar playing, "except that the Stones were much more down to earth. More basic." To further emphasise the Stone's resemblance to their Liverpudlian rivals, Easton wanted the group to wear uniform suits on stage, as the Beatles did. They were also to present themselves as all things to all men and women, "direct[ing] Beatle-esque grins" at the audience and avoiding controversy. To this end he attempted to stop band members swearing on stage, to which Jagger muttered "bloody hell". Easton retorted, "bloody hell, you don't say". He considered that compromises had to be made before the British public would accept them: their long hair was an obvious target. For their first photoshoot, Easton bought the band shiny waistcoats, white shirts, slim-jim ties, black trousers and Cuban-heeled boots. Among the band, says rock journalist Paul Trynka, Jones was "the most enthusiastic about the new managers; that spring of 1963 he remained the Stone with whom Oldham and Easton would huddle and share plans". Easton ensured that the group's money was kept in discrete bank accounts, in order to lower their collective tax bill (although in the event, he overlooked that they would also be liable for tax on touring income). Easton also arranged generous credit with fashionable stores in London; this, says Sandford, allowed Jagger and Richards "to run up impressive bills that they waved away airily on presentation".

The first gig Easton booked for the Stones was a benefit concert in Battersea Park organised by the News of the World. Easton had some doubts as to the quality of Jagger's singing voice, comparing it in the negative to Roy Orbison and Elvis Presley. Sandford describes Easton—"his voice falling to a reverential murmur"—as being worried that the BBC would not approve of it. As a result, Easton pushed for the band to replace Jagger; Jones seemed agreeable to the suggestion, but Oldham vetoed it, calling them both "completely insane". However, in 1965 Easton told KRLA Beat his reaction to seeing the group play for the first time:

The jazz musician George Melly said Oldham "looked at Mick like Sylvester looks at Tweetie Pie", while Easton was "impressed, but with certain reservations". Easton's son Paul later told how his father was amazed at what he saw in the Crawdaddy, as well as the numbers queuing for entry outside.

Increasing fame, increased pressure
In May 1963, Easton supervised the group's first recording session at Decca's West Hampstead studios, where they recorded a  cover version of Chuck Berry's "Come On". Oldham had booked three hours' studio time with Easton's cash, on the proviso, said Easton, that they did not run overtime. In the meantime, Easton was booking all the gigs he could for the band, and they were playing at least every night, and sometimes twice. The following month the band applied for an audition at the BBC, but were turned down as not suitable.  Easton feared that this rejection would prevent the band getting radio exposure. The BBC thought Jagger "sounded too black", says Davis. Once again, Easton argued to sack Jagger, but in the meantime, under pressure from the group's fans, in July the BBC offered Easton a date for the group's audition. The following month Easton began booking the group into a series of ballroom appearances, so marking the end of their days as a club-based blues band, suggests Davis.

Easton deliberately took the group out of London. Their first tour was around East Anglia, playing distant towns such as Wisbech—their opening gig—Soham, Whittlesey and King's Lynn. This was hard work, commented Oldham later, as "most places north of Luton were Beatles territory". Easton's strategy was to get the band into a habit of non-stop gig; this would make them well known around the country. He was lucky that a nationwide tour by Bo Diddley and the Everly Brothers was about to commence, and Easton was able to have the Stones hired as a backing group. This was relatively successful, suggests Davis, considering the relatively poor showing of "Come On". Although the group saw little immediate change in their circumstances, Easton was organising their future "on the path ordained for an aspiring 'beat' group—the dreary round-Britain path of the pop package show". He was, says Jackson, "busting a gut" to get the group gigs and interviews, and as well as running their fan club from his office. For the remainder of 1963, the group were playing almost every night.

Reviews of the group's first single were, says Norman, lukewarm, but according to Easton, "Come On" sold 40,000 records, and he paid them £18 each in royalties and was incensed when they took the song off their live repertoire soon after. In mid-1963 they were given the as-yet-unreleased song "I Wanna Be Your Man" by the Beatles. It was to be the Stones' second single and was recorded at Regent Sound Studios on Denmark Street—described by a roadie as "tiny, ropey, and look[ing] like someone's front room"—overseen by Easton. The song met with mixed reviews, but Easton's production was praised by Johnny Dean of Beat Monthly. The B-side was "Stoned". Easton, says Davis, "scammed" both the group and his business partner by assigning the rights for the song to a company he had co-ownership in, without their knowledge. On the other hand, he bought the group a brand new Volkswagen van for their touring needs—"which I thought was very good of him", commented Richards later, "considering he was making a heavy fortune off us"—and regularly acted as producer during their studio sessions, as Oldham often failed to turn up. Easton, says Stewart, did not trust Oldham in a recording studio. He also negotiated free stage equipment from Jennings Music in return for endorsements. On one occasion, the equipment was worth £700.

Easton favoured Brian Jones over the other band members; Davis suggests that a private deal existed between them whereby, for example, when on tour, Jones and his then-girlfriend would stay in nicer hotels, and Jones would receive £5 more in payment than his colleagues for being the frontman. Jones' girlfriend, Lynda Lawrence, later said that "there was this camaraderie, and understanding between them". Easton may have prevented Wyman from being sacked alongside Ian Stewart, whom Oldham wanted to remove as not looking sufficiently part of the band. Easton did, however, acquiesce to Stewart's dismissal; Oldham later came to believe that both Jones and Wyman were a pro-Easton faction within the group.

Problems in America and at home
In June 1964 Easton organised the group's appearance on the BBC's Juke Box Jury. This became extremely controversial, as the group refused to abide by the script, and voted against every record they were played. Around the same time, Easton travelled to New York to organise the Stones' first US tour with Decca's subdivision London Records. In New York they stayed at the Hotel Astor in Times Square. This was to cause problems: Easton rarely knew either the promotor or the venue he was booking. To save money, everyone shared rooms, and Easton was in the same room as Ian Stewart; Norman argues "it was not so much a tour as a series of one-nighters". In an attempt to get the group onto the Ed Sullivan Show, Easton personally visited Sullivan, but Sullivan, Easton later said "threw me out of the place, essentially".

The group also appeared on Dean Martin's Hollywood Palace show; it was not a success. Says Davis, Martin "went out of his way to insult them in his introduction". As a result, Jagger phoned Easton—by now returned to the UK—"and yelled at him". For Easton, says Stewart, the Hollywood show "was the thin end of the wedge". Easton was blamed for a poorly-organised circuit: while some shows in New York were well attended, on other occasions they played to small crowds, either in massive stadia such as the 15,000-seater Detroit Olympia—where they played to an audience of about 600 people—or fairgrounds and fields in Nebraska (where, Wyman later recalled, "you could just tell they wanted to beat the shit out of you").

There was growing tension between Easton and Oldham as well, as the latter had "discovered that Easton had demanded kickbacks from local promoters" while they were touring. Easton, meanwhile, found Oldham's erratic behaviour bizarre. In his attempts at creating an image for himself, Ian Stewart describes Oldham as being "more interested in the image of Phil Spector, running around in big cars, with bodyguards, collecting money, and buying clothes" than producing records. Easton, says the author Fred Goodman, "as unflinchingly middle class as any man who ever worked in the music business, could only scratch his head". The group's road manager, Mike Dorsey, visited Easton in Ealing and asked him to control Oldham.

Easton—who by this time saw the group as being as big as The Kinks—had booked the group to top the bill at the National Jazz and Blues Festival in Reading, with 50% of the door receipts for the band, who were to be billed as "the triumphant return for the conquering heroes" of America. Soon after they appeared on the BBC's flagship music programme, Ready Steady Go!. When they left, Jones was left behind because of the fan crush; Easton gave him a lift, with Jones hiding in the floor of the car. The autumn  of 1964 British tour saw Eric Easton Ltd receive 20% of the tour profits, and when the Stones beat the Beatles in the Melody Maker's popularity poll, Easton brought each member a new watch. Following the tour, however, Easton and the group sued the tour promoter, Robert Stigwood for supposedly withholding profits. Easton wrote to Stigwood, "we have made every effort to settle the matter amicably, unfortunately without success. The Stones were paid their basic salaries as agreed. This action is over profits".

On the group's second US tour, in late 1964, Easton caught pneumonia in New York and returned to London to recover. Following his illness, he contemplated a world tour, with the taking in Australia, New Zealand and the Far East. At about this time, Easton found out that Watts had secretly got married the previous month, and commented: "I suppose now I will have to buy him a wedding present". Meanwhile, relations continued to sour with Oldham. While the group was in America, Easton booked them onto several radio shows in the UK, including Saturday Club and Top Gear. Oldham found out and cancelled; when the group failed to appear for the BBC shows, the fans were angry and the BBC engaged its lawyers. Easton was under pressure to make deals for the band that were as good as the Beatles had had; he wrote to his US concert agent, Norman Weiss, saying:

Discontent within the group 

As the group became more famous, says Forget, the pressure on Easton was beginning to show. Oldham had been predominant in dealing with the Stones' image and creative development. Easton attended to the financial side, but the group was concerned, says Forget, that Easton would be unable to manage the band's approaching fame. Richards believes that Easton—whom he said was tired by then—may have been ill, and this may have affected his work. Either way, he said, he felt that Easton "wasn't big enough to handle anything outside of England". He expanded on this in a 1975 Rolling Stone Interview, saying that once the band broke America, "this cat Easton dissolved. He went into a puddle. He couldn't handle that scene." Wyman, on the other hand, contests Richards' view of Easton's departure, saying that it was "untrue and a camouflage. Easton functioned efficiently." Easton had also helped sour relations with Oldham: claiming that their work for the Stones was now so big that it necessitated more office space, Easton evicted Oldham from his backroom in Regent Street. Oldham suggests that "in fact, Eric was just totally pissed off. He'd had it with me, my style of personal management."

Although Easton had organised another Stateside tour for autumn 1965, the band was increasingly unhappy under his management. Although they had earned millions touring, they only received £50 a week from Impact Sounds and, says Davis, were permanently short of money. Oldham—by now having moved out of the Regent Street office and no longer on speaking terms with Easton—"wasted no opportunity to bad-mouth his partner to Jagger and Richards", emphasising Easton's lack of "hip" or "cool". Communication between the two had been difficult for some time, says Wyman, who also notes that, although a number of contractual discussions were taking place between Oldham and the group, Easton "was conspicuously absent" from them. Oldham also sent Easton telegrams in Jagger's name, which Easton only discovered were not from the singer when the two spoke on the phone and Jagger denied all knowledge of them. Easton for his part reminded Oldham that, as far as he was concerned:

By July 1965—partly motivated by Oldham's exposure of Easton's underhand dealings with Jones—Oldham and the Stones had agreed that Easton would be forced out. Trynka argues that it was Jones' extra £5 that acted as a catalyst for the others' discontent: "The extra fiver marginalized Easton and Brian—and Oldham used it to his advantage". Wyman seems to have attempted to mount a defence of Easton, but, according to Goodman, he was shouted down by Richards, who accused the bassist of being "fucking mercenary".

On 27 August 1965 at a "bitterly acrimonious" band meeting, a number of allegations were made against Easton, who Wyman says kept his cool throughout the proceedings. Easton reminded the group—and Oldham and Klein—that as far as he was concerned, his contract still had nine months to run; he also argued that Oldham had withheld payments from him. Easton was replaced by New Jersey-born record company auditor Allen Klein, who Norman says "dazzled" Oldham. For his part, Oldham may have been worried about the immediate future: the Stones' contract with Decca was about to expire, and he may have feared that if Easton had the opportunity to renegotiate it, he might exclude Oldham.

Dismissal
Easton was also sacked as the group's booking agent and replaced by Tito Burns. Clayson suggests that Easton's dismissal was as a result of divide and conquer tactics by Klein, who had originally been employed to undertake some of Oldham's administrative work but was able to persuade Oldham that Easton was no longer required. Trynka says Easton was sacked in favour of the "far more predatory Allen Klein" by an Oldham-Jagger-Richards triumvirate. In 1968, Easton's barrister described him as having been ousted, and music writer Nicholas Schaffner later called it a purge on Oldham's part. It is likely that Richards was the prime motivator behind the move; one of the things he liked about Klein was that "at least he was under fifty". Easton was summarily sacked, and an attempt to buy him off failed. In October 1971, Easton launched a series of lawsuits for breach of contract against the band, Oldham, Decca, London Records, Allen Klein and Nanker Phelge. As a result, the High Court froze a million pounds-worth of the Stones' UK assets until the case was concluded. Decca was also instructed to suspend all royalty payments to the group. This process was to last many years. Wyman was, in his own words, "the lone voice to express reservations".

Easton's barrister, Peter Pain, told the court that "in many ways, the whole story is rather sad... it is probably no exaggeration to say that everybody is suing everybody". Easton attempted to enforce a prison committal against Oldham for failing to pay monies owed or to supply documentation. Oldham, says Goodman, was keen to avoid Easton's lawsuit if possible and was

 While Oldham's paranoia and fear of a trial for perjury increased, Easton appears to have found the affair little more than "disheartening or silly"; the first time Oldham ran away from him, Easton called after him "you'll have to accept them [the documents] sooner or later, you naughty boy...". It was two years before Oldham was eventually brought to earth, and Easton's lawyers confronted Klein robustly in November 1967. Easton eventually settled for a golden handshake of $200,000 in withheld royalties, in exchange for which he would drop his future claims. On the other hand, according to Easton himself, he voluntarily left the band, on account of the lifestyle not suiting him and the "unsavoury people" he was forced to deal with.

Later life
Easton attempted to put his own side of the story across, but according to Trynka, he was frozen out of the popular music press who "only talked to winners, not losers". According to the Melody Maker writer Chris Welch, who interviewed Easton, he was "sad and despondent"; Welch's interview was, however, spiked by his editor Ray Coleman, whom Welch believed to have been influenced by Oldham. Easton sued Oldham for breaking their contractual partnership, although, suggests Jackson, "he had difficulty serving the papers on Andrew as he would literally leg it". The group's subsequent contracts with Decca and London Records—arranged by Klein—explicitly excluded Easton from claiming anything from them in future. Richards summed up the perspective of the group on Easton's departure:

The group's 1966 single, "Paint it Black"—later the opening track on the album Aftermath, had its origins in what author Tim Dowley calls a "mickey-taking session"—a send-up, says Richards—out of Easton, in which Wyman played a Hammond organ. Richards later recalled how, "Bill was playing the organ, doing a piss-take on our old manager [Easton], who started as an organist in a cinema pit. We'd been doing it with funky rhythms and it hadn't worked out and he started playing it like this [a sort of unintentional klezmer parody]". It was also, suggests Trynka, "in tribute to [Easton's] earlier career as an organist on the chicken-in-a-basket circuit".

Jones had been "profoundly disturbed" at the expulsion of Easton, "his one ally" in the group by then, and Easton's departure contributed to Jones' descent into depression and drug use. Easton was still in business in 1967 when he had moved his offices to Little Argyll Street, around half a mile (0.80 km) north along Regent Street. Following the death of Jones in July 1969, Easton attended his funeral in Cheltenham along with Wyman and Watts .

Easton attended a birthday party that was held jointly for Richards and Bobby Keys at Olympic Studios on 18 December 1970. In 1971, the Stones—facing a serious financial crisis—sued Easton and Oldham, among others, for failing to ask Decca Records to increase their royalty payments, which, alleged Jagger, it had turned out Decca had been willing to do but had not been asked to.

Other work
Easton managed a number of other bands and artists, particularly of the middle of the road genre. Among his clients he counted David Bowie's first group, The Konrads, although the Konrads, unlike the Stones, "never progressed beyond the suburban pub circuit", says Sandford, and may not have been particularly interested in them.  Easton also ran Julie Grant—whom Easton saw as a successor to Helen Shapiro—and booked her to back the Stones on their first UK tour. Easton claimed to have managed the Dave Clark Five before the Stones, and organised their first American tour. His partnership with them, though, says Easton, ended because the group thought him to be concentrating too much on the Stones and not enough on them. Easton also managed Bert Weedon, Mrs Mills and the host of ITV's popular music show Thank Your Lucky Stars, Brian Matthew. Through Matthew, Easton had arranged the Stones' first TV appearance. Clayson says that Easton was "respected and liked by his many prestigious artistes" due to his background in the industry and the fact that he was committed to their long-term success. For example, for Weedon he had obtained a residency on the BBC's Billy Cotton Band Show, and Mills he obtained a place for on ITV's children's series, the Five O'Clock Club. According to Peter Townsend, Easton believed that the Stones' impact would be ephemeral and that it would be his other clients—Grant, Weedon and Mills—who would be his long-term investments. Easton, says Townsend, also had other sidelines to buffer him financially, telling Townsend, "if this popular music business collapses, I'm not terribly worried. I've got a nice little income guaranteed; I hire out 20 organs to Butlins."

Personal life
For much of his career, Easton lived in Ealing. He was married—his wife had been a dancer—with two children, and "his one luxury was a caravan on the south coast", wrote Oldham later. In 1980, Easton and his wife were holidaying regularly in Florida. First, they stayed in Miami and then made their way down the Tamiami Trail to Naples, to where they decide to retire the same year. There he opened Easton's Music Centre—trading in pianos and organs—and a real estate business. In an interview, Easton later claimed to have kept in touch with the Stones into the 1990s.

Easton was married to Mary, with whom he had a son, Paul. Paul also went into the entertainment industry, forming ABA Entertainments Consultants. Easton and Paul took in concerts together when artists were in the area, and Paul himself, said Easton, undertook a "whirlwind tour" of the UK in 1990 at the Stones' invitation. The invitation, said Easton, was the result of the group vacationing in Naples, and the Eastons dining with them. Paul later said that his father's business ensured he grew up what he termed a "showbiz brat".

Easton died in 1995, 67 years old. In his 1998 autobiography, Oldham writes that sometime in the "early 90s", after hearing that Easton had not long to live, he telephoned him in Florida "to attempt a closure to all our acts on this earth. Eric came to the phone, but didn't really want to speak with me—his call." Following his death, the Eric Easton Awards were launched in Naples; named after him, they were intended to highlight the three best local student pianists of the year with a public recital.

Reputation
Trynka calls Easton "the forgotten man of the Stones story". Clayson argues that, notwithstanding Easton's own prim dislike of the beatnik culture, it did not "prevent him from turning a hard-nosed penny or two when the opportunity knocked". Wyman, speaking to the Evening Herald's Eamon Carr in 1990, also believed that, while the Stones in their early days were consistently poor—"all the expenses went onto the band", he said—Oldham and Easton, "probably were quite wealthy". This, suggests Wyman, was both on account of the management team earning twice what the group did, and also that, following their departures, both men received large pay-offs. Giorgio Gomelsky—whose interest in the Stones was "cultural rather than business-orientated"—was unimpressed by either Easton or Oldham, saying "frankly, I thought those two were pretty low-flying characters with no interest in blues, underdog culture or social justice! Dollar signs were pointing their way." The publicist and talent scout Lesley Conn also thought that Easton was a bad choice of manager for the Stones, arguing that Easton "really screwed 'em to the wall". Richards, likewise, considers that Easton and Oldham "fucked Giorgio", although Oldham says that neither he nor Easton knew of Gomelski's existence when they signed the band.

To the contemporary music journalist Sean O'Mahoney, Easton was "vital. Andrew knew nothing about the business side of it... he needed someone who did." Easton was conservative, businesslike and practical as well as "calm, dependable and knew the ropes". he was generally "much-maligned", argues Trynka. Decca executive Dick Rowe called Easton "respected, a steady pair of hands he could rely on". Easton was also highly trusted by journalists. Oldham later criticised Easton as lacking artistic vision, while the music executive Harold Pendleton says of the two men's relationship that "Eric Easton was a run-of-the-mill manager, calm, cold and efficient. Loog Oldham was a temperamental chancer and a fellow who understood artistic people. The combination of the two was better than either of them apart." Within the band, Easton was most respected by Wyman, who was a few years older than his colleagues and did not see Easton as distant from the group as they did. Clayson suggests that age was the relevant factor, as the few years Wyman had over the other Stones meant that he had a similar experience of the post-war depression as Easton. Wyman later described Easton as a "cautious, kindly" figure, diligent in his work and treatment of his clients. Richards called him a "very nice guy". The band generally respected Easton, says Norman, for financing them when they were an unknown quantity, "and whom, in spite of his desperate naffness, they all rather liked". He also emphasised the dangers, in his opinion, of letting hindsight colour the importance of Easton in the group's progression:

In 1991, Easton told a reporter that he was glad the Rolling Stones had become as successful as they had, as "it sort of shows that I know what I'm doing, too, doesn't it?"

Discography

Notes

References

Bibliography

 
 
 
 
 
 
 
 
 
 
 
 
 
 
 
 
 
 
 
 
 
 
 
 
 
 
 
 
 
 
 
 
 
 
 
 
 

 
 
 
 
 
 
 
 
 
 
 
 
 
 
 
 
 
 
 
 
 
 
 
 
 
 
 
 
 
 
 
 
 
 
 
 
 
 
 

English record producers
English music managers
The Rolling Stones
1927 births
1995 deaths
Musicians from Lancashire
Businesspeople from Lancashire
Talent agents
20th-century English businesspeople